Grant Nelson is an American college basketball player for the North Dakota State Bison.

Early life and high school
Nelson grew up in Devils Lake, North Dakota and attended Devils Lake High School. He played mostly on the junior varsity team as a freshman and sophomore. Nelson averaged 16.4 points, 11.5 rebounds, and 5.1 blocks per game and was named second team All-State during his junior season. He was named North Dakota Mr. Basketball as a senior after averaging 25 points, 18 rebounds, and 5.7 blocks per game. Nelson committed to play college basketball at North Dakota State (NDSU) over offers from the University of North Dakota and  Division II programs Northern State, University of Mary, Minot State, and Minnesota State-Moorhead.

College career
Nelson played in all 27 of NDSU's games with five starts as a freshman and was named the Summit League Sixth Man of the Year after averaging 6.3 points and 3.7 rebounds per game. He became a starter as a sophomore and averaged 11.6 points and 4.9 rebounds per game. During Nelson's junior season, a highlight reel of his play went viral in early January 2023. As a junior, Grant averaged 17.9 points and 8.9 rebounds per game, as well as shooting 53.2% from the field. These stats also earned him his first All-Summit First Team and All-Summit Defensive Team honors.

References

External links
North Dakota State Bison bio

Living people
American men's basketball players
Basketball players from North Dakota
North Dakota State  Bison men's basketball players
Power forwards (basketball)